The  is an inactive professional wrestling mixed tag team championship co-promoted by the Wrestling of Darkness 666 (Triple Six) and Ice Ribbon promotions. The title was established in 2011. There have been two reigns among two teams. Yuko Miyamoto and Risa Sera are the current champions in their first reign.

History
On July 18, 2011, Team Phoenix (Hikari Minami and Dynasty) defeated Team Yankee Ribbon (Yuko Miyamoto and Chii Tomiya) in the final of a 4-team "Mixed Tag Team 1-Day tournament". Following their victory, they were awarded the inaugural title on September 9.

After two successful defenses, the title was vacated in March 2013 due to a lack of defenses. On March 24, Yuko Miyamoto and Risa Sera defeated Taro Yamada and Tsukushi to win the vacant title. The title has not been defended since, nor has it been officially deactivated.

Inaugural tournament

Reigns

See also

Professional wrestling in Japan

References

Notes

Footnotes

External links
 Young Ribbon Mixed Tag Team Championship (in Japanese)

Tag team wrestling championships